The Elkhead Mountains are a mountain range in Colorado. The mountain range is considered to be low altitude within Colorado as all of the peaks are under . Located within Routt and Moffat counties, the Elkhead Mountains are far from metropolitan areas and have few lakes and streams, so they attract relatively few visitors.

The mountain range is of volcanic origin and all of the peaks were formed by volcanic action. Almost all of the peaks within the Elkhead Mountains are a part of Routt National Forest. Significant peaks include Bears Ears, Sugar Loaf, Saddle Mountain, Black Mountain, Pilot Knob, and Meaden Peak.

See also

Park Range (Colorado)
Mountain ranges of Colorado

References

External links

Mountain ranges of Colorado
Landforms of Routt County, Colorado
Landforms of Moffat County, Colorado